Craibiodendron is a genus of flowering plants belonging to the family Ericaceae.

Its native range is Assam to Indo-China.

Species:

Craibiodendron henryi 
Craibiodendron scleranthum 
Craibiodendron stellatum 
Craibiodendron vietnamense 
Craibiodendron yunnanense

References

Ericaceae
Ericaceae genera